The M202 FLASH ("Flame Assault Shoulder") is an American rocket launcher manufactured by Northrop Corporation, designed to replace the World War II–vintage flamethrowers (such as the M1 and the M2) that remained the military's standard incendiary devices well into the 1980s. The XM202 prototype launcher was tested in the Vietnam War, as part of the XM191 system.

Description
The M202A1 features four tubes that can load 66 mm incendiary rockets. The M-74 rockets are equipped with M235 warheads, containing approximately 1.34 pounds (610 g) of an incendiary agent. The substance, often mistaken for napalm , is in fact TPA (thickened pyrophoric agent).

TPA is triethylaluminum (TEA) thickened with polyisobutylene, in the presence of n-hexane, preventing spontaneous combustion after the warhead rupture. TEA, an organometallic compound, is pyrophoric and burns spontaneously at temperatures of 1600 °C (2912 °F) when exposed to air.  It burns "white hot" because of the aluminum, much hotter than gasoline or napalm. The light and heat emission is very intense and can produce skin burns from some (close) distance without direct contact with the flame, by thermal radiation alone. A crowd control agent round using CS gas, the XM96, was trialed, but never entered service.

The weapon is meant to be fired from the right shoulder, and can be fired from either a standing, crouching, or prone position. It is loaded with a clip which holds a set of four rockets together, which is inserted into the rear of the launcher and can be pushed past the launching position to enable the launcher to be carried while loaded more easily.

The M202A1 was rated as having a 50% chance of hit against the following targets at the noted ranges, assuming all four rockets were fired at the same time:

 Bunker aperture: 50 meters
 Window: 125 meters
 Weapons position or stationary vehicle: 200 meters
 Squad-sized troop formation: 500 meters

History 
The United States Army issued M202s as needed, with each rifle company's headquarters being authorized a single launcher, generally issued as one per rifle platoon. While vastly more lightweight than the M2 flamethrower it replaced, the weapon was still bulky to use and the ammunition suffered from reliability problems. As a result, the weapon had mostly been relegated to storage by the mid-1980s, even though it nominally remains a part of the U.S. Army arsenal.

In USMC service, the M202 was issued to dedicated teams of 0351 Assaultman at the battalion level. The Weapons Platoon's assault section contained three squads, each with a launcher team. With the introduction of the SMAW in the mid 1980s, the M202 was phased out and replaced by SMAW launchers.

The M202A1 has been among weapons listed on the inventory of U.S. units in the War in Afghanistan.

Operators

Current operators
 
Republic of Korea Army

United States Army

See also
 FHJ 84
 RPO-A Shmel (Bumblebee)

Notes

References
 US Army Manual, TC 23-2, 66 mm rocket launcher M202A1, April 1978
 TM 3-1055-456-12 M202A1 Operator's Manual.
 : Pyrophoric flame composition

External links 

 M202A1 Flame Assault Shoulder Weapon (Flash) at Gary's U.S. Infantry Weapons Reference Guide]
 66 mm Incendiary Rocket M74 at Designation Systems
 TC 23-2 66 mm Rocket Launcher M202A1—US Army Manual, April 1978
 M202 FLASH grenade launcher / flamethrower at Modern Firearms
 M202 FLASH on Youtube
 This Rocket Launcher Was the U.S. Army’s Last Flamethrower War is Boring

Cold War rockets of the United States
Incendiary weapons
Salvo weapons
Military equipment introduced in the 1970s